NGC 4571 is a spiral galaxy located in the constellation of Coma Berenices that William Herschel thought was Messier 91 in Charles Messier' catalog of deep-sky objects, before nearly two centuries later that object was determined to be the nearby barred spiral galaxy NGC 4548.

Physical properties 
The finding of Cepheids by the Canada France Hawaii Telescope in 1994 has established that this galaxy is a member of the Virgo Cluster.

Despite being classified as a late-type galaxy, NGC 4571 has features more typical of spiral galaxies of earlier Hubble type such as a high color index, both low star formation rate and H-Alpha brightness, and relatively little neutral hydrogen, suggesting it may have lost most of its gas due to interactions with Virgo's intragalactic medium and/or past interactions with other galaxies of the cluster.

The low-surface brightness galaxy Malin 1 is located close to this object. It is totally unrelated, however as it lies at a much higher distance.

Gallery

References

External links 
 
 SEDS – NGC 4571

Unbarred spiral galaxies
Virgo Cluster
Coma Berenices
4571
7788
42100
IC objects